The High Sheriff of Limerick City was the Sovereign's judicial representative in the city of the City of Limerick. Initially an office for lifetime, assigned by the Sovereign, the High Sheriff became annually appointed from the Provisions of Oxford in 1258. Besides his judicial importance, he had ceremonial and administrative functions and executed High Court Writs. The office was abolished in 1920 on the formation of the Irish Free State.

High Sheriffs of Limerick City

16th century

17th century

18th century

19th century

20th century

References

 List of High Sheriffs of Limerick City 1197–1700
 List of High Sheriffs of Limerick City

 
Limerick City